Lithophane scottae, the fireweed groundsel, is a species of cutworm or dart moth in the family Noctuidae. It is found in North America.

The MONA or Hodges number for Lithophane scottae is 9904.1.

References

Further reading

 
 
 

scottae
Articles created by Qbugbot
Moths described in 2006